The Louguantai Temple (Chinese: 楼观台寺), in Tayu village, Zhouzhi county, Shaanxi province, about 70 km west of Xian, is the place where tradition says that Lao Tze composed the Tao Te Ching.

The Daqin Pagoda is located less than one mile to the west of Louguantai.

References 

Taoist temples in China
Religious buildings and structures in Shaanxi